Harlowton is a city in and the county seat of Wheatland County, Montana, United States. The population was 955 at the 2020 census.

Description
The city was once the eastern terminus of electric operations (1914–74) for the "Pacific Extension" of the Chicago, Milwaukee, St. Paul and Pacific Railroad ("Milwaukee Road").  Here, steam or diesel locomotives were changed or hooked up to electric locomotives for  trip through the Rocky Mountains to Avery, Idaho.  Harlowton was founded in 1900 as a station stop on the Montana Railroad, a predecessor to the Milwaukee, and was named for Richard A. Harlow, the Montana Railroad's president.

The area around Harlowton is rich in agriculture, the leading products being wheat, barley, cattle, sheep and honey bees. Major employers are Wheatland Memorial Healthcare, Harlowton High School, Hillcrest Elementary School, Musselshell Ranger District, Midtown Market 2 Grocery Store, Rays Sport and Western Wear, Cream of the West, Rocky Mountain Cookware, TicketPrinting.com, and the Judith Gap Wind Farm.  The local newspaper is the Times Clarion.

Harlowton is surrounded by the Crazy, Little Belt and Big Snowy Mountains, which are a part of the Lewis and Clark National Forest. The National Forest offers plenty of acreage for recreational activities; camping, sightseeing, hunting, OHV riding, snowmobiling, etc.  Fishing access sites are located along the Musselshell River or at nearby Deadman's Basin or Martinsdale Reservoir.  There are three parks located within Harlowton: Chief Joseph Park, Deer Park, and Fischer Park.  The old Milwaukee Railroad trackbed has been converted into the “Smoking Boomer” trail. Of special interest are the pioneer bronze sculpture (entitled And They Called the Land Montana) and the Veteran's Honor Wall located in front of the Wheatland County Court House.

The Rodeo, Wheatland County Youth Fair, and Harlowton Kiwanis Show are annual events that take place in Harlowton.  Area attractions include the Upper Musselshell Museum, Milwaukee Depot Museum, and Jawbone Creek Country Club.  There is a public library, pool, theater, airport, and rifle range.  Within 100 miles are the Nez Perce National Historic Trail, Charles M. Bair Museum, and Showdown Ski Area.

Prehistory

The Upper Musselshell River Valley is named for the Musselshell River, which got its name from the large number of freshwater mussels found in its river bed.  In the fall and winter weather, the bison would migrate to the lower altitudes along the Musselshell River.  Early plains hunters, taking advantage of the large bison population, frequented this area. Some of the tribes that traveled through the area were the Crow, Blackfeet, Flathead, Gros Ventre, Northern Cheyenne, Nez Perce, Shoshones, Sioux, and Assiniboine.

Harlowton lies within the Montana High Plains that form a part of the Northwestern Plains.  The area is most known archeologically for the line of demarcation which was mutually established between the Crow and Blackfeet tribes that passed through the area. This fifty-mile rock line fence crossed east to west from the Big Snowy Mountains to the Crazy Mountains.  The rock line hunting boundary was the cause of several battles in the area.

Within Wheatland County, site surveys have recorded and assigned archaeological site numbers to Sentinel Rock, the Fish Creek Pictograph, Owl Canyon Pictograph, Winnecook Petroglyph, Fortification site, and to several buffalo jumps in the area.  The Big Snowy, Little Belt, Castle and Crazy Mountains have produced five wickiup (conical timbered lodges) sites and several pictograph sites.

On May 7, 1868, a treaty with the Crow Nation and the United States Government opened the Musselshell River Valley to settlement.

The first sheep operation on the Upper Musselshell was started by P.J. Moore in 1878.  The first large cattle operation in the area was the Chicago Montana Livestock Company in 1882, with S.S. Hobson as part owner and manager.

Big Nose George robbery
In 1878, JV Salazar (Mexican John) was robbed of his horses, grub, and guns near the present site of Harlowton by the noted horse thief George Parrott (Big Nose George). At the time of the Salazar robbery, George Parrott was known to be camping on the Musselshell River with Andrew Garcia, where he was holding a bunch of stolen horses on his way to Canada. Big Nose George was later lynched at Rawlins, Wyoming.

Merino/Harlowton

The town of Merino was officially established in 1881. The name Merino came from the breed of sheep (Merino) that were run in the area by Charles Severance at the time.  The trading post owned by John and Archie McEachnie housed the post office, store and saloon. The first railroad into the area was the Montana Railroad (nicknamed the “Jawbone Railroad”) in 1899.  The Montana Railroad terminal was located one mile northwest of Merino, so it was decided to relocate the town site.  On June 10, 1900 Richard Harlow, father of the Montana Railroad, and Arthur Lombard, surveyor and promoter of the Montana Railroad, auctioned off lots of the new town site.

The name Merino was changed to Harlowton on November 9, 1900.  The first building to be erected in the new town site was a barber shop, owned by Thomas Hanzlik.

On June 17, 1907, a fire destroyed 24 buildings on the north side of Harlowton's Main Street.  The town was rebuilt, though most of the construction took place on Central Avenue to correspond with the Milwaukee Railroad plot.

The first town election was held on June 6, 1908.  Mr. A. T. Anderson was elected mayor.

The grand opening of the Graves Hotel was on June 19, 1909, with a banquet and dance.  Andrew Chris Graves was the principal owner.  The Graves Hotel was added to the National register of historic places on August 6, 1980.

On February 22, 1917 legislature passed an act which created Wheatland County from Meagher and Sweet Grass Counties.  The act took effect on April 1, 1917.  Wheatland County became the 41st county in Montana, and Harlowton became the county seat.

Wheatland County was the first county in the US to go over its goal in the World War I Liberty Bond drive of 1918.

The 163rd Infantry Regiment is a regiment of the Montana National Guard based in Harlowton. It went overseas with the 41st Infantry Division in World War II.

Milwaukee Road
In 1906, the Chicago, Milwaukee, St. Paul and Pacific Railroad ("Milwaukee Road") started building west with its route coming though Harlowton.  On December 5, 1907, work was started on the Milwaukee Railroad Roundhouse in Harlowton.  The first passenger train from the east rolled into Harlowton on March 9, 1908, with freight trains to follow.  In 1915 the Milwaukee Railroad was electrified from Harlowton to Avery, Idaho — over 450 mountainous miles.  Harlowton became the eastern terminus of electric operations and was known as “the place where electricity replaces steam.”  The Milwaukee Railroad dropped its electrified system in 1974, just months before the OPEC oil embargo of the United States.  The Milwaukee Railroad was abandoned following a bankruptcy settlement and the last train that went through Harlowton was in March 1980.  Milwaukee Road Historic District was listed in the National Register of Historic Places on July 8, 1988.  The depot has been converted into the Harlowton Milwaukee Depot Museum.

21st century

Agriculture has remained a staple for the local economy. The main products are wheat, barley, oats, hay, cattle, sheep, and honey. There are many businesses supporting the agriculture industry in Harlowton; the Wheatland County Farm Service Agency, veterinary clinics, a feed store, ranch supply store, auto and mechanical shops, hardware stores, and a saddle repair shop.

Harlowton and Wheatland County boast an industrial business segment, with some truly unique products from stone to steel griddles, honey for your local pancakes to event tickets.  The wide variety of products span the globe. E S Stone & Structure Incorporated  and Montana Rock and Stone LLP have multiple stone quarries around the area from which an extensive line of rock and stone products are produced. Rocky Mountain Cookware manufactures die stamped steel griddles and broilers, it was established in 1992.  Steve Park Apiaries provides pollination and offers a variety of beeswax and honey products.  Cream of the West whole grain hot cereal was established in 1914 and its production facility was moved to Harlowton in 2002.  TicketPrinting.com is an internet-based ticket printing company that provides online services and printed products for event hosts. The main printing facility was opened on September 11, 2001 in Harlowton.  TicketPrinting.com is the largest private employer in Wheatland County.

The Judith Gap Wind Farm is located north of Harlowton along US Highway 191.  There are 90 wind turbines situated on 8000 acres of land that produce 135 Megawatts of power. The Judith Gap Wind farm was established in 2011 and is owned by Invenergy LLC.  The power produced by this facility enters the Northwest Energy grid and is distributed where needed. Other wind farms located near Harlowton are the Musselshell Wind Project by Shawmut, the Two Dot Wind Farm by Two Dot, and Gordon Butte Wind LLC by Martinsdale.

Health facilities include Wheatland Memorial Healthcare, Deer Creek Dental, Remedies Pharmacy, Harlowton Mental Health Center, Public Health & Human Service Department, Massage Therapy, Wheatland County Senior Citizens Center, and Wheatland Memorial Nursing Home.  The Wheatland Memorial Healthcare Center has a Clinic, Emergency Room, Laboratory, X-ray, and Physical Therapy Department.

The financial institutions are the Citizens Bank and Trust Company and the Tricounty Federal Credit Union.  Offering insurance needs are the Farm Bureau Insurance Company and Mid-Montana Insurance Company.  Harlowton has two motels; the Corral Motel and Country Side Inn.  There are clothing stores, thrift stores, boutiques, restaurants and saloons.

School District 16 includes the Hillcrest Elementary (K-6) and Harlowton High School (7-12).  The mascot is the Harlowton Engineer and school colors are maroon and gold.

The Jawbone Creek Country Club is listed in the Guinness Book of World Records for being the only golf course with a cemetery in it. The nine-hole course has a front and back nine by tee placement and offers clubhouse facilities, a driving range, and practice green.

The Barnsion is a first class vacation rental, wedding venue, and event center located on the Miller Ranch in Harlowton.

Harlowton has two museums, the Upper Musselshell Museum and the Milwaukee Depot Museum.  The Upper Musselshell Museum was founded in 1984 by the Victor Fischer family. It occupies two historic buildings and is filled with rotating displays of the Upper Musselshell's history and paleontology. The Museum centerpiece is a full-size replica of the Avaceratops lammersi dinosaur, the first dinosaur found of its kind. The Upper Musselshell Museum is located along Montana's 'Dinosaur Trail' and is open from May until September.   The Milwaukee Depot Museum train depot was built in 1908, it was a "Standard Class A Passenger Station", one of several standardized depot plans used by the Milwaukee Road. The passenger Service was discontinued in 1961, and the depot and yards were abandoned by the Milwaukee in 1980. The depot was restored as a Milwaukee Railroad museum.

Paleontology
The town of Harlowton is located in the Fort Union Geological formation and is famous for its Paleocene fossils. In 1902 Albert Silberling, a local homesteader and self-taught paleontologist, discovered the Douglass Quarry southwest of Harlowton. Albert Silberling and Earl Douglass, a Princeton University paleontologist, discovered fossil remains of primitive mammals including the Ptilodus, Phenacodus, and Plesiadapis in the quarries southwest of Harlowton.  Albert Silberling's discoveries from fossils excavated in the Harlowton area have subsidized the information about life in the Paleozoic era.

The Rugocaudia cooneyi and Tatankacephalus cooneyorum are two new dinosaur species that were found southwest of Harlowton.  The Rugocaudia cooneyi is a new sauropod dinosaur that was described and named by the paleontologist Cary Woodruff in 2012. The genus name Rugocaudia means “wrinkle tail” and the species name honors the landowner J. P. Cooney.  The Tatankacephalus is a new ankylosaur dinosaur species found in 1997 by Bill and Kris Parsons, research associates of the Buffalo Museum of Science.

The Avaceratops lammersi dinosaur was found on the Lammers family Careless Creek Ranch northeast of Harlowton and is the first of its kind. The Aveceratops is a small horned dinosaur that belongs to the Ceratopsidaie family.  Eddie and Ava Cole discovered the fossil remains in 1981. Dr. Peter Dodson, Professor of Paleontology and Veterinary Anatomy at the University of Pennsylvania, participated in further excavation and transported the specimen to the Academy of Natural Sciences of Philadelphia.  A cast of the Avaceratops lammersi is on display at the Upper Musselshell Museum in Harlowton.

Geography and climate
Harlowton is located at  (46.436455, -109.833553).

The town is located on the slopes of the Crazy Mountains. Other surrounding mountain ranges include the Big Snowy Mountains, Little Belt Mountains, Bull Mountains, and the Castle Mountains.

According to the Köppen Climate Classification system, Harlowton has a cold semi-arid climate, abbreviated "BSk" on climate maps.

Demographics

2010 census
At the 2010 census, there were 997 people, 478 households and 267 families residing in the city. The racial makeup of the city was 95.4% White, 0.7% Native American, 0.2% Asian, 0.5% from other races, and 3.2% from two or more races. Hispanic or Latino of any race were 1.9% of the population.

There were 478 households, of which 21.3% had children under the age of 18 living with them, 43.7% were married couples living together, 8.2% had a female householder with no husband present, 4.0% had a male householder with no wife present, and 44.1% were non-families. 40.2% of all households were made up of individuals, and 19.9% had someone living alone who was 65 years of age or older. The average household size was 2.03 and the average family size was 2.71.

The median age in the city was 49.8 years. 19.3% of residents were under the age of 18; 5.9% were between the ages of 18 and 24; 19.3% were from 25 to 44; 29.2% were from 45 to 64; and 26.1% were 65 years of age or older. The gender makeup of the city was 48.5% male and 51.5% female.

2000 census
At the 2000 census, there were 1,062 people, 496 households and 281 families residing in the city. The population density was 1,842.9 per square mile (707.0/km). There were 599 housing units at an average density of 1,039.5 per square mile (398.8/km). The racial makeup of the city was 97.08% White, 0.75% Native American, 0.19% Asian, 0.19% from other races, and 1.79% from two or more races. Hispanic or Latino of any race were 1.98% of the population.

There were 496 households, of which 21.0% had children under the age of 18 living with them, 46.6% were married couples living together, 6.7% had a female householder with no husband present, and 43.3% were non-families. 41.3% of all households were made up of individuals, and 21.8% had someone living alone who was 65 years of age or older. The average household size was 2.07 and the average family size was 2.79.

20.9% of the population were under the age of 18, 5.3% from 18 to 24, 20.0% from 25 to 44, 26.4% from 45 to 64, and 27.5% who were 65 years of age or older. The median age was 47 years. For every 100 females there were 91.7 males. For every 100 females age 18 and over, there were 91.8 males.

The median household income was $23,636 and the median family income was $34,205. Males had a median income of $22,750 compared with $19,265 for females. The per capita income was $13,717. About 4.7% of families and 10.3% of the population were below the poverty line, including 8.0% of those under age 18 and 14.1% of those age 65 or over.

Infrastructure
Wheatland County Airport is a county-owned, public-use airport located two miles (4 km) northwest of town.

Education
Harlowton Public Schools educates students from kindergarten through 12th grade. Harlowton High School's team name is the Engineers.

Harlowton Public Library serves the area.

Notable people
 S. Stillman Berry, zoologist, died at Winnecook Ranch, near Harlowton
 Marcel "Dutch" Callant, prominent merchant, established the Callant Family Foundation for the community of Harlowton. 
 Edward Mathias Gans, recipient of the Nation's Doctor of the Year award in 1956.
 Thomas Patrick Gerrity, former United States general and commander of the Air Force Logistics Command, was born here.
 Andrew Chris Graves, prominent merchant in Harlowton's early years, built the Graves Hotel and donated the land for the Harlowton Park.
 Thomas Hanzlik, bought the first lot in Harlowton, there he built the first house and first barbershop in town.
 Richard Harlow, founder of Harlowton and president of the Montana Railroad.
 James F. Jenks, paleontologist and geologist, specialist of the Triassic Ammonoidea.
 Bertha L. Lunceford, Wheatland County's first superintendent of schools.
 Dick and Mac McQuitty owned the Harlowton Grocery Store. They made possible the building of the McQuitty Football Field in 1950.
 Albert Silberling, paleontologist, discoverer of the Douglass, Gidley, and Silberling  Quarries and some Paleozoic fossils. 
 Thomas Sorboe, Harlowton's first photographer, many of his photographs are on display in the Upper Musselshell Museum and on the Museum of the Rockies website.  He was also an architect and helped build many of the first businesses in Harlowton.
 Ernest Stein, engineer on the Milwaukee Railroad and artisan of elaborate woodwork. His carvings are on display at the Upper Musselshell Museum.
 Ben Urner, founder of the Urner Mercantile Company, the first business in Harlowton.
 Bill Wilkerson, artist, writer and engineer on the Milwaukee Road.  Wrote a series of books about the Milwaukee and Montana Railroads.

See also

 List of municipalities in Montana

References

External links

Cities in Montana
Cities in Wheatland County, Montana
County seats in Montana
Populated places established in 1900
1900 establishments in Montana